This is a list of schools in the city of Perth, Western Australia. The Western Australian education system traditionally consists of primary schools, which accommodate students from kindergarten to Year 6, and high schools, which accommodate students from Years 7 to 12. Previously primary schools accounted for Year 7 education, but in 2015 all Western Australian schools transitioned Year 7 to be a part of the high school system. In country areas, district high schools serve as both primary and junior high schools, with students generally commuting to or boarding at larger towns to finish the last two years of their education.

Public schools

Primary schools

High schools

Other schools

Defunct public schools

 Primary schools

 High schools

Private schools

Catholic primary schools
In Western Australia, Catholic primary schools are usually (but not always) linked to a parish. Prior to the 1970s, most schools were founded by religious institutes, but with the decrease in membership of these institutes, together with major reforms inside the church, lay teachers and administrators began to take over the schools, a process which completed by approximately 1990. The Catholic Education Office (CEO), headquartered in Leederville, was established in 1993 and is responsible for co-ordinating administration, curriculum and policy across the Catholic school system. Preference for enrolment is given to Catholic students from the parish or local area, although non-Catholic students are admitted if room is available.

Until 2009, Catholic primary schools accommodate students from kindergarten to year 7 in the Western Australian school system, but from 2010, year 7 students are accommodated by the Catholic high school system. The change is limited to Catholic schools; almost all others (state and independent) remain K-7 schools.

Independent primary schools
Independent primary schools (officially referred to as "non-systemic schools" in Part 4 of the School Education Act 1999) comprise those which are outside the State or Catholic systems. These schools are officially registered by the Minister based on formal advice from the chief executive officer of the Department of Education and Training, following an application by the governing body of the school at least six months in advance of the school's opening. It is an offence in Western Australia to run an unregistered school, under Section 154 of the Act. Under the previous Act (Education Act 1928), a school could commence first but had to apply within one month for "efficient" status, which would be granted by the Minister after inspection and a comprehensive audit by the Department (Section 32A).

K–12 and Secondary Schools

Defunct Private Schools

See also
Lists of schools in Australia

References

External links
Schools Online, a directory of Government schools in Western Australia. (Department of Education and Training – Government of Western Australia)
School Search, at Catholic Education Office of Western Australia.
Search for School, at Association of Independent Schools of Western Australia.

Lists of schools in Western Australia
 
Schools 1